The following Delaware state symbols have been approved by the Delaware General Assembly and added to the Delaware Code:

Colors 
The official colors are colonial blue and buff

Seal 

The seal of Delaware was first adopted on January 17, 1777, with the current version being adopted April 29, 2004. It contains the state coat of arms surrounded by the inscription "Great Seal of the State of Delaware" and the dates 1704, 1776 and 1787.

Flag 

The flag of Delaware was first adopted on July 24, 1913. It consists of a buff-colored diamond on a field of colonial blue, with the coat of arms of the state of Delaware inside the diamond. Below the diamond, the date December 7, 1787, declares the day on which Delaware became the first state to ratify the United States Constitution. The colors of the flag reflect the colors of the uniform of General George Washington.

Fruit 

The strawberry was adopted as the state fruit in 2010.

Dessert 

Peach pie was adopted as the state dessert in 2009.

Motto 
"Liberty and Independence" was approved in 1847, and derived from the Order of Cincinnati.

Song 
"Our Delaware" was first adopted in 1925.  It is a poem containing three verses written by George B. Hynson, a fourth verse written by Donn Devine, and a musical score composed by Will M. S. Brown.

Nicknames

The First State 
This nickname was officially adopted on May 23, 2002, to commemorate the fact that on December 7, 1787, Delaware became the first of the 13 original states to ratify the U.S. Constitution.

The Diamond State 
This nickname comes from the legend that Thomas Jefferson described Delaware as a jewel among states due to its strategic location on the Eastern Seaboard.

Blue Hen State 

This nickname comes from the fighting Blue Hen cocks that were carried with soldiers for entertainment during the Revolutionary War.

Small Wonder 
This nickname comes from substantial contributions Delaware has made as compared to its relatively small size.

The Last State 
Some residents of states that were also formerly part of the 13 original colonies have given this name to Delaware as a parody or insult to its classic nickname "The First State."

Bird 
The Delaware Blue Hen was officially adopted on April 14, 1939, having been used as many political campaigns and publications.

Tree 

The American holly (Ilex opaca) was officially adopted May 1, 1939, regarded as one of Delaware's most important forest trees.

Flower 

The peach blossom was officially adopted on May 9, 1895, in recognition of peach tree orchards yielding thousands of dollars worth of crop worth at that time.

Bug 

The lady bug was officially adopted April 25, 1974, at the suggestion of Mollie Brown-Rust's 2nd grade class at the Lulu M. Ross Elementary School in Milford, Delaware.

Mineral 

Sillimanite was recognized by geologists in Delaware prior to 1830, is widespread throughout the schists of the Delaware Piedmont, and occurs as large masses and stream-rounded boulders at the Brandywine Springs State Park.

Fish 

The weakfish (Cynoscion regalis) was officially adopted in 1981 in recognition of its values as a game and food fish.

Beverage 

Milk was officially adopted on June 3, 1983.

Herb 

Sweet goldenrod (Solidago odora) was officially adopted June 24, 1996, as indigenous to the state, commonly found in coastal areas and along the edges of marshes and thickets.

Fossil 

Belemnite was officially adopted on July 2, 1996, at the suggestion of Kathy Tidball's third grade Quest students at Martin Luther King, Jr. Elementary School in Wilmington, Delaware. The fossil, an extinct  squid with a conical shell, is commonly found along the Chesapeake and Delaware Canal.

Butterfly 

The eastern tiger swallowtail (Pterourus glaucus) was officially adopted on June 10, 1999, as indigenous to Delaware and commonly found in deciduous woods, along streams, rivers, and wooded swamps, and in towns and cities throughout Delaware. They were chosen based on a statewide vote of public and parochial students, out of suggestions from students of the Richardson Park Learning Center.

Star 
The star TYC 3429-697-1 in the Ursa Major constellation was officially adopted on 2000, after it was nicknamed "The Delaware Diamond". Despite being the official state star, its name is not recognized by astronomical community, because it was named by the private company International Star Registry.

Soil 
Greenwich loam was officially adopted on April 20, 2000, as commonly found in all counties in Delaware and enhancing water quality, agriculture, wildlife habitat, and natural landscape beauty.

Marine animal 

The horseshoe crab (Limulus polyphemus) was officially adopted on June 25, 2002, in recognition of its importance and value in the medical field and as the principal food source for more than a million shore birds.

Macroinvertebrate 

The stonefly (order Plecoptera) was officially adopted on May 4, 2005, in recognition of the importance of excellent water quality and the vital role played by healthy aquatic ecosystems. It was supported by Gunning-Bedford Middle School, Salesianum High School, Delcastle Technical High School, Dickinson High School Environmental Club, The Independence School, Springer Middle School, St. Andrews School, and The Charter School of Wilmington.

Wildlife animal 
"Grey fox" (Urocyon cinereoargenteus) was adopted as the state wildlife animal in 2010.

Tall ship 

The Kalmar Nyckel was adopted in 2016 as the state tall ship, serving "as Delaware’s seagoing ambassador both at home and at many ports of call, raising awareness of the First State for thousands who see her and come on board."

Other

See also
List of Delaware-related topics
Lists of United States state insignia
State of Delaware

References

External links
 Delaware Facts and Symbols

State symbols
Delaware